Yuriy Igorevich Pimenov (29 March 1958 – 19 April 2019) was a Russian rower who mostly competed in the coxless pairs, rowing with his twin brother Nikolay. Between 1978 and 1993 the brothers won a silver medal at the 1980 Olympics, as well as three gold, three silver and one bronze medal at the world championships. They finished in 6th and 15th place at the 1988 and 1992 Games, respectively, missing the 1984 Olympics due to their boycott by the Soviet Union. They went to the Friendship Games instead, dubbed the alternative Olympics, where they won gold.

Pimenov was an international rowing referee and the chief referee of the Russian Rowing Federation. In 1994 he became the third person to receive the Thomas Keller Medal, the highest honor in rowing.

References

1958 births
2019 deaths
Russian male rowers
Soviet male rowers
Olympic rowers of the Soviet Union
Olympic rowers of the Unified Team
Rowers at the 1980 Summer Olympics
Rowers at the 1988 Summer Olympics
Rowers at the 1992 Summer Olympics
Olympic silver medalists for the Soviet Union
Russian twins
Olympic medalists in rowing
Twin sportspeople
World Rowing Championships medalists for the Soviet Union
Medalists at the 1980 Summer Olympics
Thomas Keller Medal recipients